Kala Shah Kaku railway station (Urdu and ) is located in Kala Shah Kaku town, Sheikhupura District of Punjab, Pakistan.

See also
 List of railway stations in Pakistan
 Pakistan Railways

References

External links

Railway stations in Sheikhupura District
Railway stations on Karachi–Peshawar Line (ML 1)